The 2012–13 season is Newcastle Jets' eighth consecutive season in the A-League since its foundation season in 2005–2006.

Players

Senior squad

Youth squad

Transfers

Summer

In:

 

 

Out:

Winter

In:

 

Out:

Competitions

Overall

A-League

Results by round

Results summary

Results

League table

National Youth League

Regular season

League table

Results summary

League Goalscorers by round

NBN State Football League

Regular season

League table

League Goalscorers by round

W-League

Regular season

Results summary

League table

League Goalscorers by round

Squad statistics

Appearances and goals

|-
|colspan="14"|Players who appeared for Newcastle Jets no longer at the club:

|}

Goal scorers

Disciplinary record

References

Newcastle Jets FC seasons
Newcastle Jets